Kim Jong-woo (Korean: 김종우; born 1 October 1993) is a South Korean footballer who plays for Gwangju FC.

Career
Kim started his career with South Korean top flight side Suwon Samsung Bluewings, where he played from 2015 to 2020.

For the 2015 season, Kim was sent on loan to Suwon in the K League 2, the second division of South Korean football.

References

External links
 Kim Jong-woo at Soccerway

South Korean footballers
Living people
Association football midfielders
1993 births
People from Suwon
Suwon Samsung Bluewings players
Suwon FC players
Sportspeople from Gyeonggi Province